Idris Naikwadi (born ) He was mayor of Sangli-Miraj & Kupwad municipal corporation. He has a Bachelor of Commerce degree from Chintaman College, Sangli.  He is the son of Iliyas Naikwadi.

Present Positions 
Lifetime Member of All India Mayor's Conference, New Delhi
Mayor, Sangli-Miraj & Kupwad city municipal corporation
Director, Sangli district Central Cooperative Bank Ltd
Secretary, Azad Education Society’s Jawahar High School and Junior College, Miraj
President, Martial Art Association Of India (Maharashtra)
Chairman, Miraj High School, Miraj
Chairman and Founder, Al-Amin Education Society’s Dr.Salim Urdu High School, Miraj
Winner, Common Men's Heart of Sangli Miraj Kupwad Mahanagarpalika
Trustee, Arbi Urdu highschool, Miraj
President, Naikwadi's Group Of Institutes

Awards
 Vikas Ratna Award, International Institute of Success Awareness, New Delhi, for outstanding services achievements and contribution.
 Rashtriya Gaurav Award, India International Friendship Society. New Delhi, for meritorious services, outstanding performance and remarkable role.
 Best Mayor Of The Year (Maharashtra) 2011-2012, All India Institute of Local Self-Government.
 Best Planning Award 1997, urban development department of Maharashtra.

External links
 mayor info
 sakal e-paper
 UBI

Living people
Businesspeople from Maharashtra
Year of birth missing (living people)